Windsor Township is located in Shelby County, Illinois. As of the 2010 census, its population was 1,474 and it contained 675 housing units.

Geography

Demographics

References

External links
City-data.com
Illinois State Archives

Townships in Shelby County, Illinois
Townships in Illinois